David John Werring  (born October 1967) is a British physician, neurologist, and academic specialising in stroke. He is professor of Neurology at the UCL Queen Square Institute of Neurology and current head of Stroke Research Centre and the department of Brain Repair & Rehabilitation at UCL.

Career 
Werring received his Bachelor in Neurosciences in 1989 and his Bachelor in Medicine/Bachelor in Surgery from Guy's Hospital Medical School in 1992. He became a Member of the Royal Colleges of Physicians of the United Kingdom (MRCP) in 1995 and finished his PhD in clinical neurology at the UCL Queen Square Institute of Neurology in 2000. After completing his clinical training in neurology and stroke medicine in 2004, he was appointed consultant neurologist at the National Hospital for Neurology and Neurosurgery, University College Hospital and Watford General Hospital in 2005. Werring was made Reader in clinical neurology and honorary consultant neurologist in 2008, became a fellow of the Royal College of Physicians (FRCP) in 2012 and was made full professor at UCL Queen Square Institute of Neurology in 2015. In 2017, he became head of the research department of Brain Repair & Rehabilitation at the UCL Queen Square Institute of Neurology.

Werring is a recognized expert in the field of stroke, and he is the head of UK Stroke Forum since 2021 and the president-elect of the British and Irish Association of Stroke Physicians since 2022.

Scientific expertise 
The core field of research of Werring is stroke, in particular cerebral small vessel disease, intracerebral hemorrhage and cerebral amyloid angiopathy. He published more than 300 peer-reviewed article on those topics and in other fields of clinical neurology. Werring led several studies investigating cerebral microbleeds and has expertise in neuroimaging, with a focus on brain MRI. He is currently the primary investigator of a large multi-centre study investigating the timing of oral anticoagulation after ischemic stroke, founded by the British Heart Foundation and has been involved in several studies investigating the influence of COVID-19 and respective vaccines on stroke. He is the author of more than 350 articles in scientific journals with a h-index of 90, editor of the Queen Square textbook of Neurology and an editorial board member of several high-impact scientific journals, including the European Stroke Journal, International Journal of Stroke and the European Journal of Neurology.

Selected works

References 

1967 births
Living people
British neurologists
Academics of University College London
Alumni of King's College London